Manpreet Singh (born 5 October 1994) is a Singaporean cricketer. In October 2018, he was the leading wicket-taker for Singapore in the Eastern sub region group of the 2018–19 ICC World Twenty20 Asia Qualifier tournament, with eleven dismissals in six matches. Later the same month, he was named in Singapore's squad for the 2018 ICC World Cricket League Division Three tournament in Oman. He played in Singapore's opening fixture of the tournament, against Oman on 10 November 2018.

In July 2019, he was named in Singapore's Twenty20 International (T20I) squad for the Regional Finals of the 2018–19 ICC T20 World Cup Asia Qualifier tournament. He made his T20I debut for Singapore against Qatar on 22 July 2019.

In September 2019, he was named in Singapore's squad for the 2019 Malaysia Cricket World Cup Challenge League A tournament. He made his List A debut for Singapore, against Qatar, in the Cricket World Cup Challenge League A tournament on 17 September 2019. In October 2019, he was named in Singapore's squad for the 2019 ICC T20 World Cup Qualifier tournament in the United Arab Emirates. In November 2021, he was selected to play for the Colombo Stars following the players' draft for the 2021 Lanka Premier League.

References

External links
 

1994 births
Living people
Singaporean cricketers
Singapore Twenty20 International cricketers
Singaporean sportspeople of Indian descent